Melissa Mars is a French actress and singer-songwriter. She appeared alongside John Travolta in From Paris With Love produced by Luc Besson (Nikita, Lucy). She won a best supporting actress award for her performance in The Cabining, and had her song "Beautiful" included in Coca-Cola's "52 Songs of Happiness" worldwide music compilation.

She released three solo albums with Universal Music, and featured on duets, including "1980" which reached number 5 in the charts. She was in Mozart the Rock Opera, which sold more than 1,500,000 tickets.

Biography 
Mars started acting at the age of 13 in her hometown of Marseilles. At 16 she moved to Paris with her single mother and continued acting while pursuing a curriculum of math and science at the Lycée Louis-Le-Grand.

She made her film debut in the Laurent Heynemann feature, One Way Ticket. She became a singer-songwriter, partnering with Lilas Klif, her mother, to co-author lyrics. She released three solo albums with Polydor - Universal Music as well as several duets. Her single 1980 reached number 5 in the charts.   

In 2009 she combined her vocal and acting talents for a leading role in the rock musical, Mozart The Rock Opera, directed by Olivier Dahan. She played the role of Aloysia for 346 shows in front of over 1,500,000 spectators, resulting in three NRJ Music Awards, a diamond record (over 700,000 sales), and a 3D movie filmed by FX guru Mark Weingartner (The Matrix, Inception).

She appeared in the Super Bowl spot for From Paris with Love alongside John Travolta. Five more American feature films followed in less than a year, in which she starred alongside the likes of Vivica A. Fox (Kill Bill), Tom Sizemore (Saving Private Ryan), David Proval (Mean Streets, The Sopranos), and Vinnie Jones (Snatch, X-Men).

In 2014, Coca-Cola included her bossa nova song Beautiful in its 52 Songs of Happiness compilation.

In November 2014, her role in The Cabining garnered a best supporting actress award at the FANtastic Horror Film Festival in San Diego, California.

Mars uses her fluency in Arabic, one of five languages she speaks besides French, English, Spanish, and German, for her series regular role as a spy on a TV show, Khamsa. She is also one of the leads in Curse of Mesopotamia, the first international feature film shot in Kurdistan, Iraq. The movie was interrupted by the events with ISIS in Iraq, but shooting resumed and wrapped six months later in Jordan.

She had her American TV debut on Lifetime in Deadly Delusions, a thriller alongside Haylie Duff (Napoleon Dynamite) and Teri Polo (Meet the Parents, The Fosters).

Her series of Children of China portraits was exhibited in Paris for a month during the International Children’s day, printed on canvas, which measured nearly six feet long.

Discography

Studio albums 
2003: Et alors! (Polydor, #104 France)
2005: La Reine des abeilles (Polydor, two versions)
2007: À la recherche de l'amour perdu (Polydor, #93 France)
2009–2010: Mozart, l'opéra rock, cast musical studio album (Warner, #2 in France)

EPs 
2006: Remixes (including Apocalips)
2011: Et je veux danser (single and remixes)
2011: Just Only Wanna Dance (single and remixes)
2014: Tweet N' Roll (single and remixes)
2016: I Will Rise (single and remix)

Singles

Collaborations 
2002: Garonne, she performs 4 songs in Garonne TV miniseries soundtrack
2005: Les Homéricains, duet with Lara Fabian, released on Lara Fabian 9
2006: La Machine, duet with Pascal Obispo, released on Les Fleurs du Bien (#5 in France)
2006: 1980, duet with Pascal Obispo, released on Les Fleurs du Bien (#5 in France)
2006: Les Frôleuses, duet with Louis Bertignac
2007: Eden Log, she performs on 2 tracks of the movie Eden Log's soundtrack
2009: Mozart, l'opéra rock, musical studio album (#2 in France)
2010: Digital, Duet with Riot in Paris
2012: Week-end Love, duet with Dogwalker 
2012: Je reprends ma route, with 40 other French artists, they record the single for the children's organisation Les voix de l'enfant 
2012: Dead Flower, she composes the score for the short movie Glimpse, and performs the closing credits song.   
2014: Staying Alive, she records the closing credits song for the movie The Cabining 
2016: I Will Rise, she records the closing credits song for the movie Curse of Mesopotamia

Filmography 
1996: Titane, by Daniel Moosmann
1998: Locked-in Syndrome, by Isabelle Ponnet (short subject)
1998: Le Rire du bourreau, by Elsa Chabrol (short subject)
1999: Virilité et autres sentiments modernes, by Ronan Girre
2000: P.J. on France 2, by Gérard Vergez (TV series)
2001: Un aller simple, by Laurent Heynemann
2002: Garonne (TV series directed by Claude d'Anna, in which she also sings the title song)
2010: From Paris with Love, by Pierre Morel
2010: Mozart, l'opéra rock, filmed-in-3D version of the musical 
2013: Glimpse, by Daryl Ferrara (short movie)
2013: My Cage, de Guillaume Campanacci (short movie)
2014: The Cabining, by Steve Kopera (multi-awarded horror comedy)
2015: Sorrow, by Millie Loredo, starring Vannessa Vasquez
2015: Assassin's Game, by Anoop Rangi, Lionsgate Digital, starring Tom Sizemore, Vivica A. Fox
2015: Lost Angelas, by Ana Maria Manso & William Wayne - in post-production
2016: Six Ways To Die, by Nadeem Soumah, eOne, starring Vinnie Jones, Dominique Swain
2016: Curse of Mesopotamia, by Lauand Omar (first international movie shot in Iraq)
2016: Virtual Revolution, by Guy-Roger Duvert (multi-awarded science fiction movie)
2018: Puzzled, by Michael Bergmann, original comedy series pilot
2018: Deadly Delusions, by Nadeem Soumah, movie for Lifetime, starring Haylie Duff, Teri Polo... 
2018: The Letter Red, by Joston Theney, modern adaptation of Macbeth

Awards 
Nomination: Best ensemble cast in « Virtual Revolution » @ First Glance Film Festival
Best supporting actress in « The Cabining » @ the Fantastic Horror Film Festival 2014, San Diego, CA
Best Ensemble Cast in « Mozart The Rock Opera » @ NMA 2010, FR

References

External links 
  Official site
  Official actress site
 

1981 births
Living people
French songwriters
Polydor Records artists
French film actresses
French television actresses
Musicians from Marseille
21st-century French singers
21st-century French women singers
Actresses from Marseille